The British Society for the History of Mathematics (BSHM) was founded in 1971 to promote research into the history of mathematics at all levels and to further the use of the history of mathematics in education.

The BSHM is concerned with all periods and cultures, and with all aspects of mathematics.  It participates in the Joint Mathematical Council of the United Kingdom.

The Society's journal, the British Journal for the History of Mathematics, is published on behalf of BSHM by Taylor & Francis.

Neumann Prize 

The Neumann prize is awarded biennially by the BSHM for "a book in English (including books in translation) dealing with the history of mathematics and aimed at a broad audience." The prize was named in honour of Peter M. Neumann, who was a longstanding supporter of and contributor to the society. It carries an award of £600.The previous winners are:

2021: The Flying Mathematicians of World War I, Tony Royle
2019: Going Underground, Martin Beech
2017: A Mind at Play, Jimmy Soni & Rob Goodman
 2015: The Thrilling Adventures of Lovelace and Babbage, Sydney Padua.
 2013: The History of Mathematics: A Very Short Introduction, Jacqueline Stedall.
 2011: The Math Book, Clifford A. Pickover.
 2009: The Archimedes Codex, Reviel Netz and William Noel.

Past Presidents of the BSHM 
1971–1973: Gerald Whitrow

1974–1976: Clive Kilmister

1977–1979: John Dubbey

1980–1982: Graham Flegg

1983–1985: Frank Smithies

1986–1988: Ivor Grattan-Guinness

1989–1991: Eric Aiton

1992–1994: John Fauvel

1995–1996: Steve Russ

1997–1999: Judith V. Field

2000–2002: Peter Neumann

2003–2005: June Barrow-Green

2006–2008: Raymond Flood

2009–2011: Tony Mann

2012–2014: Robin Wilson

2015 - 2017: Philip Beeley

2018 - 2020: Mark McCartney

2021 - 2023: Sarah B. Hart

References

External links 
 BSHM website

Organizations established in 1971
Mathematical societies
History of mathematics
Learned societies of the United Kingdom
1971 establishments in the United Kingdom